Space Cowboy: The Collection is the first compilation album by the French-born English recording artist Space Cowboy. It contains remixes of the songs "I Would Die 4 U," "Crazy Talk," and "Just Put Your Hand In Mine" and contains the never before heard song, "Heavy Metal." It was released by Southern Fried Records on November 22, 2010.

Track listing

References

2010 compilation albums
Space Cowboy (musician) albums